Quintavalla is an Italian surname. Notable people with the surname include:

Fausta Quintavalla (born 1959), Italian javelin thrower
Francesco Quintavalla (born 1982), Italian footballer
Pedro Julio Quintavalla (1850–?), Chilean military officer

Italian-language surnames